Ivan Božičević (born 27 May 1961 in Belgrade, Serbia) is a Croatian composer, pianist, organist and jazz musician.

Biography

Božičević was born in Belgrade. After initial piano studies, he joined the composition class of A. Obradović at the Belgrade Faculty of Music. He graduated in 1984, earning a master's degree in 1989. Until 2001 he occupied a teaching post for Harmony, Counterpoint and Analysis there and at the Academy of Arts in Novi Sad. In December 2001 he moved to Split, Croatia, where he started working as a free-lance artist. As of 2018, Ivan leads the newly formed composition class at the Split Academy of Arts.

From 1984 to 1988 he studied organ at the Hochschule für Musik in Frankfurt with the renowned professor Edgar Krapp. His work encompasses a broad repertoire, with  special emphasis on baroque and modern music. Specializes early organ music in Salamanca (with Guy Bovet and Montserrat Torrent). Gives many successful concerts in Croatia, Germany, Hungary, Serbia, Spain, Sweden, Switzerland and the United States.

His creative output encompasses three symphonies, orchestral, chamber, choir and soloistic works, as well as electronic compositions and jazz music. He received numerous composition awards, and his works are frequently played on radio, TV and concerts (performances in Croatia, Germany, Russia, Serbia, Sweden, the United Kingdom and the United States).

After moving to Split, he widens his music activity to include organ and piano playing, composing, arranging and theatre music. His collaborations include top Croatian jazz and pop musicians (Dražen Bogdanović, Tedi Spalato, Hari Rončević) as well as Dalmatian klapa ensembles («Cambi»). Božičević runs a jazz-band called SplitMinders, whose repertoire is based on originals and arrangements of dalmatian folk songs. He also works with the fusion band "Waveform" and various other jazz, blues and bossa-nova formations. Božičević is a founding member of the Split society for contemporary music ("Splithesis", 2008). As of 2018, he leads a newly-formed composition class at the Academy of Arts in Split.

Awards and recognitions

Awards that Božičević has received for his compositions include: Stevan Hristić Award, Silver Medal of the Belgrade University of Arts (Serbia); Mandolina Imota, Cro Patria Golden Cathedral, Hrvatski sabor kulture (Croatia); CEC Artslink Fellowship Award, Garth Newel Award, Aliénor Award, AGO/ECS Publishing Award, AGO/Marilyn Mason Award, Random Access Music Award, (United States); Anton Stadler Award, John Clare Award (United Kingdom); Prague Philharmonic Choir Composition Award (Czech Republic); Premio Cristobal Halffter (Spain); Trio Anima Mundi Prize (Australia), European Organ composition competition (Luxembourg).

Selection of works

Symphony orchestra:

Music for big orchestra (1983)
Essercizi sinfonici (1986)
Five haiku after Bashô (1989)

Chamber ensembles:

Sonata (1981) for violin and piano
Three ‘female’ songs (1981) for soprano voice and piano
Pathways (1982) for string quartet
Rivers, like in a dream (1983) for bass-clarinet and organ
Play E.S. (1983) for two women's voices, bass-clarinet, piano, organ, synthesizer and percussion
Essercizi da camera (1985) for 13 string players
Chamber Music (1986) for soprano voice, violoncello and piano (poetry of J. Joyce, in English)
Mandorle dolce, mandorle amare (1999) for mandolin orchestra
Marittimo (2006) for oboe, piano and string orchestra; version for soprano saxophone, piano and string quintet (2008); version for trumpet, piano and string quintet (2010)
Airborne (2007) for bas clarinet and string quartet (or string orchestra); version for clarinet and string quartet (2008)
Pebbles (2008) for flute, oboe, double-bass and piano
Cascades classiques (2008) for string orchestra
Canto de la ave rapiega (2009) for violoncello and piano; version for bass clarinet and piano, version for bass clarinet and organ (2012)
A thousand pines, one Moon (2009) for chamber ensemble; version for two pianos (2012)
Lamento (2009) for alto flute and organ
Tracing (2010) for one harmony and three melody instruments
Sustainable development (2010) for chamber ensemble; version for two pianos (2016)
Raven's Pass (2010) for basset clarinet and piano
Monkey Face (2010) for violin, viola, cello and piano; version for string quartet and piano (2016)
Spring passes (2011) for piano four-hands  and string quintet; version for two pianos (2013)
Alienor Courante (2011) for soprano (or choir), cello (or gamba) and harpsichord
Ascent to the Cold Mountain (2012) for string quartet
Prayer Wheel/Coiling Clouds (2013) for saxophone quartet
Shaken From a Crane's Bill (2014) for clarinet, violin and piano
Come, Sit With Me in the Clouds (2016) for violin, cello and piano
Ibis (2016) for flute, cello and piano
Circling (2017) for clarinet quartet; also version for guitar quartet
Cor mundum (2018) for soprano voice, flute and organ

Keyboard instruments:

Five haiku after Bashô (1987) for organ
Sotto voce (1994/2008) for piano
Behind the cloud (1996) for organ
Microgrooves (2011) for harpsichord; version for organ (2016)
Summer in the world (2013) for harpsichord
If There Is a Place Between (2014) for harpsichord
The Moonpiper (2015) for organ
Summer Triptych (2015) for organ
Radiance Triptych (2016) for organ
Ariel (2017) for two pianos
Willows are Green, Flowers are Crimson (2021) for amplified harpsichord and computer-controlled organ
Organic Steelworks (2022) for organ and tape

Computer-controlled electronics:

Senecio / Astrolabe (1992)
Sanza (1992)
Isle of voices (1992), cycle of 6 pieces
Moon's turning point (1993)
Weather Forecast of the Heart (2015) for clarinet and electronics
Hunter's Moon (2019) for flute, violoncello and electronics

Choral music:

Good Shepherd (2000), for women's choir and piano
Sundial (2003), for women's choir, percussion and piano
Veronica (2004), for women's choir and piano
The Everlasting Voices (2010), for women's choir; version for mixed choir (2010)
Kyrie eleison (2012), for mixed choir and organ
Spring passes (2012), for 8-part mixed choir and piano 4-hands; version for mixed choir a cappella ("Yuku haru ya")
With a glorious eye (2014), for mixed choir and organ
Cor mundum (2017), for mixed choir

Theoretical:

Technique and structure of fugue in organ works of D. Buxtehude (1995), dissertation paper
Introduction to Renaissance and Baroque ornamentation (1998)

References

External links
Home Page of Ivan Božičević
MySpace page of Ivan Božičević
MySpace page of SplitMinders
Hrvatsko društvo skladatelja - Ivan Božičević (in Croatian)
Diskografija.com - Ivan Božičević

Living people
1961 births
Croatian composers
Frankfurt University of Music and Performing Arts alumni